Jesters: The Game Changers (Korean: 광대들: 풍문조작단; RR: Gwangdaedeul: Pungmunjojakdan) is a 2019 South Korean historical comedy written and directed by Kim Joo-Ho.

Plot 
The story centers on a gang of con artists who are paid to boost people's reputations with rumors, exaggerated claims, and other stunts. King Sejo's adviser Han Myeong-hoe orders them to use their skills to improve public opinion of the king.

Elements of the story are based on King Sejo of Joseon, who launched a coup that allowed him to seize the throne from his young nephew. He killed a number of people to secure the throne, including his nephew Danjong of Joseon, who was poisoned following a plot to remove Sejo from power.

Cast 

 Cho Jin-woong as Deok-Ho
 Kim Seul-gi as Geun-Deok
 Park Hee-soon as King Sejo
 Son Hyun-joo as Han Myeong-hoe
 Ko Chang-seok as Hong-chil
 Yoon Park as Jin-sang
 Kim Min-seok as Pal-poong
 Choi Won-young as Hong Yoon-sung
 Jang Nam-yeol as Yang-Jung
 Kim Hee-chan as the crown prince
 Baek Soo-hee as Dodo
 Choi Gwi-hwa as Mal-bo

Release 
The film was released in South Korea on August 21, 2019, and in the following year, had its North American premiere at the Fantasia Film Festival.

Box office 
On the first day of its release the film was shown on 804 screens, sold 87,124 tickets, and grossed US$591,383, opening at #3 at the Korean box office.

Reception 
The Korea Herald reviewed the film, commenting that "While it aimed to be funny and original, and its props were quite creative, its narrative was sloppy and the parade of cheap and uncomfortable jokes unimpressive." Conversely, Asian Movie Pulse stated that it was "a respectful ode to the storytellers and the magic of storytelling as a medium of entertainment as well as propaganda, a good-looking production overall which has way more merits than demerits."

The Chosun praised the acting of Son Hyun-joo, Park Hee-soon, and Cho Jin-woong while criticizing Yoon Park's acting as awkward.

References

External links
 

2019 comedy films
South Korean historical comedy films
2010s South Korean films